Tostones (from the Spanish verb tostar which means "to toast") are twice-fried plantain slices commonly found in Latin American cuisine and Caribbean cuisine. Most commonly known as tostones, Puerto Rico, Jamaica, Nicaragua, Cuba, Florida, Honduras and Venezuela, they are also known as tachinos or chatinos (Cuba), platano frito or frito verde (Dominican Republic), bannann peze (Haiti), patacones (in Panama, Venezuela, Colombia, Costa Rica, Peru, and Ecuador) and, sometimes, patacón pisao in Colombia.

Preparation

Green (unripe) plantains are peeled, sliced length-wise, diagonally, or width-wise, and then fried twice. The raw slices of plantains are fried for one to two minutes on each side until they are golden in color, and removed and patted to remove excess cooking oil. Afterward, they are pounded flat with a hinged utensil made for the task, called a tostonera, or less conveniently, with any kitchen utensil with a large enough flat surface, for instance, between two plates. The flattened plantain slices are then fried once again until they are crisp and golden brown.

Serving

Tostones are salted and eaten much like potato chips/crisps or French fries/chips. In some regions, it is customary to dip them in mojo (a garlic sauce) or ají. In Colombia they are sometimes served with hogao sauce or topped with seasoned shredded beef. In Costa Rica, they are often eaten with a paste-like dip made from black beans. In the Dominican Republic, they are commonly served with fresh lime wedges to squeeze over them and salt for sprinkling. In Guatemala on the Caribbean side, they are usually served as a side dish with fish or any poultry, sprinkled with a little salt. In some countries, they are served topped with cheese as an appetizer or with shrimp ceviche, pulled chicken, or avocado salad. They can also be bought prepared from supermarkets. This dish is found in all varieties of Caribbean cuisine. In Nicaragua, they are typically served with fried cheese and sometimes with refried beans. In Puerto Rico, they are commonly seasoned with garlic salt and eaten with fry sauce, mojo, or pique verde boricua.

Tostones are also a staple of Latin American countries and the Caribbean, including Cuba, Puerto Rico, Dominican Republic, Panama, the north coast of Honduras, and in Haiti, where they are often served with the traditional griot (fried pork) or pikliz, a spicy slaw.

They can also be found in West African cuisine, where they are referred to as plantain crisps.

Variations
Tostones made from unripe breadfruit called  tostones de pana are served in Puerto Rico. The same method applies. Unripe breadfruit is cut into chunks, deep-fried, flattened, and then fried again. They are popular throughout the island and are sold frozen pre-made by Goya Foods, Mi Cosecha PR, and Titán products of Puerto Rico.

Other uses of the term
In Honduras, the term tostón may also refer to the 50-cent coin of the local currency, the lempira. This is also the case in Mexico with 50 cents of a peso.

In the Dominican Republic, tostones are also called fritos verde which are chunks of plantains fried, flattened, and then fried again.

See also

 Chifle
 Fried plantain
 Jibarito
 List of banana dishes
 Mofongo
 Tajada

References

Caribbean cuisine
Central American cuisine
Colombian cuisine
Costa Rican cuisine
Cuban cuisine
Dominican Republic cuisine
Ecuadorian cuisine
Guatemalan cuisine
Haitian cuisine
Honduran cuisine
Nicaraguan cuisine
Panamanian cuisine
Puerto Rican cuisine
Venezuelan cuisine
West African cuisine
Snack foods
Deep fried foods
Plantain dishes
Articles containing video clips

de:Kochbanane#Verwendung